Madaw or Madau is a village in Balkan Province in Turkmenistan. Its population as of 2013 was 10,215.

References

Populated places in Balkan Region